Physcidia striata is a species of corticolous (bark-dwelling),  lichen in the family Ramalinaceae. Found in South America, it was formally described as a new species in 2014 by lichenologists  André Aptroot, Marcela Cáceres, and Einar Timdal. It also occurs in Peru. Its  are smooth, flat, branched, and greyish-green, measuring 2–7 mm long by 0.5–1.5 mm wide. The species epithet striata refers to the faint longitudinal striations that are present on the lobe undersides. Isidia occur on the thallus surface; they are the same colour as the thallus, with dimensions of 0.3–0.7 mm long by 0.1–0.2 mm wide. When they are abraded, it reveals the whitish colour of the underlying medulla. The lichen contains divaricatic acid, a lichen product that is revealed with the use of thin-layer chromatography.

References

Ramalinaceae
Lichen species
Lichens described in 2014
Lichens of Brazil
Lichens of Peru
Taxa named by André Aptroot
Taxa named by Marcela Cáceres
Taxa named by Einar Timdal